NHL Hitz 2002 is an arcade-style ice hockey video game released by Midway Games. It is the first game of the NHL Hitz series. Midway launched this game along with NFL Blitz.

Summary
This video game was a launch title for both the Xbox and the GameCube and was also released on PlayStation 2. It differs from traditional NHL games in that it does not try to accurately simulate real-life ice hockey. The rules are much more relaxed and the attributes of players dramatically increased, giving the game its arcade feel.

The game features three players on the ice for each team, with an additional 3 players on each teams' bench.  Line changes could be done in between periods.  Fights were included in the game, but the rules of such greatly differed from NHL rules. Fights last until a player is knocked out, and the losing player is taken out of the game permanently. Since there are only 6 players per team, after one team loses 3 fights, no additional fights are allowed.  Hits are encouraged rather than penalized, with players able to knock over other players to temporarily remove them from play, incurring no penalties.

If a player scores 3 goals in one game on their respective team that player becomes "On Fire", making them tougher to knock down and giving them a more powerful shot.  If any team scores three uninterrupted one-timers, they achieve "Team Fire" in which every player has Blue Flames surrounding them and have all the advantages of the aforementioned On Fire. There are no line changes during a period and there is no regular season play. The front cover  features now retired NHL defenceman Scott Stevens of the New Jersey Devils.

The game had a skills competition section with multiple different challenges. Also featured was the ability to unlock sick heads, stadiums and throwback jerseys.

Reception

The game received "generally favorable reviews" on all platforms according to the review aggregation website Metacritic. Jim Preston of NextGens final issue called the PlayStation 2 version "the best 'wacky' sports game we've played in years." The magazine similarly said of the Xbox version, "If you're up for a game of hockey where players quite literally catch on fire and suffer frequent flights through the glass, this is superb stuff."

References

External links

2001 video games
GameCube games
Midway video games
National Hockey League video games
PlayStation 2 games
Video games developed in Canada
Xbox games